Capriotti's Sandwich Shop, Inc.  (also called Capriotti's) is a Nevada-based fast casual restaurant chain located in the United States. The restaurant chain was founded in Wilmington, Delaware in 1976. Capriotti's has 112 company-owned and franchise locations in 27 states.

History
Capriotti's was founded in Little Italy, Wilmington, Delaware in 1976. The restaurant is named after the founders' grandfather, Philip Capriotti. In 1988, the second restaurant location opened in New Castle, Delaware. In 1991, Capriotti's began franchising their restaurants.

In 1993, the first restaurant location in Las Vegas, Nevada was opened on Sahara Avenue, near Las Vegas Boulevard. In 2004, Ashley Morris and Jason Smylie opened a franchise in Las Vegas. At the time, Morris was the youngest financial adviser at Wells Fargo. Smylie was a software engineer at Bechtel Nevada. Morris and Smylie were also investors in the housing market and made the decision to invest in a franchise after learning that the return on investment was higher than anything they were looking at investing in. In 2007, Morris and Smylie put the company in escrow. In the following year Morris, Smylie and a group of investors consisting of 95% Las Vegans bought Capriotti's.  Capriotti's had 44 restaurant locations by the end of 2008. Morris is the CEO of the company. In 2008 and 2009 the chain was the official sandwich sponsor of the World Series of Poker in Las Vegas. Capriotti's was ranked in Entrepreneur magazine's top 500 franchise list in 2010 and remained ranked through 2014.

Capriotti's starred on Food Network's Unwrapped in December 2011. In November 2013, Capriotti's expanded its presence on the East Coast by opening its first location in Washington DC. Joe Biden was the first customer served at the store's grand opening. That year, Capriotti's brought in over $58 million in revenue and experienced a 48% growth over the previous three years. In 2014, the company was named one of the "Top 10 Best Food Franchises for Your Buck" and one of "America's Best Franchises" by Forbes magazine.

The Sandelman & Associates Quick Track Study on the Top 10 Quick Service Restaurant Concepts ranked Capriotti's among the top ten in overall satisfaction and won the award for highest quality and taste in the 2014 study.

Business operations
Capriotti's is based in Las Vegas, Nevada and has its largest concentration of shops there. The restaurant chain has 112 locations in 27 states including: Arizona, Arkansas, California, Delaware, Florida, Georgia, Illinois, Indiana, Iowa, Kansas, Maryland, Massachusetts, Minnesota, Missouri, Nebraska, Nevada, New York, North Carolina, Oklahoma, Oregon, Pennsylvania, Rhode Island, South Carolina, South Dakota, Texas, Utah, Washington State and Wisconsin. In 2014, it ranked #293 in Entrepreneur's Franchise 500. In 2016, Capriotti's was ranked #264 in Entrepreneur's Franchise 500.

Products

Capriotti's specializes in cold, grilled, and vegetarian hoagies or submarine sandwiches. Each restaurant roasts whole turkeys for 12 hours nightly, hand pulls meats, and makes their own meatballs and coleslaw.

In November 2009, the Bobbie, one of Capriotti's signature sandwiches, was voted "The Greatest Sandwich in America" by AOL.com. The sandwich is made with pulled turkey, cranberry sauce, stuffing and mayonnaise. The Margolets named it after their aunt. In 2012, USA Today named Capriotti's one of the "10 Great Places for a Surprising Sandwich."

Technology
Capriotti has utilized Google Glass to re-record employee training videos in a first person view. Management trainees also wear Google Glass during rush hour periods and review the footage for constructive visual feedback. Capriotti's uses an app-based loyalty program.

References

External links 

 

Submarine sandwich restaurants
Companies based in Spring Valley, Nevada
American companies established in 1976
Privately held companies based in the Las Vegas Valley
Fast casual restaurants
Restaurants established in 1976
1976 establishments in Delaware